David Arturo Ferreira Rico (born August 9, 1979) is a Colombian former footballer.

Career

Professional
Ferreira began his professional career in 1997 with the Colombian Primera B club Expresso Rojo. By 1999 he had joined Real Cartagena, helping them win a league title. In 2000, he joined América de Cali in the first division, helping the team win three consecutive championships from 2000 to 2002 before moving to Brazilian club Atletico Paranaense in 2005. During his stay with Atletico Paranaense, from 2005 to 2008, he appeared in 179 games, starting in 175 of them while scoring 38 goals and recording 42 assists. He also appeared in the first-ever USA-Brazil Challenge game against his soon-to-be team FC Dallas in Curitiba, Brazil on March 7, 2007. From February to June 2008, David was on loan to club Al-Shabab in Dubai, United Arab Emirates, making 12 appearances and helping the team win the league title before returning to Atletico Paranaense.

On February 24, 2009, Ferreira was loaned to FC Dallas in Major League Soccer. He was named MLS league MVP on November 19, 2010, after scoring eight goals and adding 13 assists during the regular season. In the playoffs, he also scored a goal against the LA Galaxy in the Western Conference finals and the club's lone goal in their MLS Cup Final loss to the Colorado Rapids. On December 20, 2010, it was announced that FC Dallas had signed him to a multi-year contract, purchasing his rights from Atletico Paranaense. He was named to the MLS Team of Week 4 in the 2011 MLS season for his two-goal performance against the Rapids. On April 24, 2011, he suffered a season-ending injury while playing against the Vancouver Whitecaps. After an absence of more than a year, on July 4, 2012, he finally made his return to the field appearing in the second half against Toronto FC. He captained the squad during the 2013 season. However, his play never returned to the high level that it was before his 2011 injury, and the club declined his contract option following the season. David then returned to play in his native Colombia.

International
Ferreira was a member of the Colombia national team, winning the Copa América in 2001, and taking part in Copa América tournaments in 2004 and 2007.

Personal life 
David is the father of Jesús Ferreira, who plays professionally for FC Dallas and the United States national team.

Honours

National
 Categoría Primera B: 1999, 2016
 Categoría Primera A: 2000, 2001, 2002
 UAE League: 2007–08
 Major League Soccer Western Conference Championship: 2010

International
 Toulon Tournament: 1999, 2000
 Copa America: 2001

Individual
 MLS Best XI: 2010
 MLS MVP: 2010

References

External links
 
 
 Atletico Paranaense's Official Website 
 rubronegro.net 

1979 births
Living people
People from Santa Marta
Colombian footballers
Colombian expatriate footballers
Real Cartagena footballers
América de Cali footballers
Club Athletico Paranaense players
Al Shabab Al Arabi Club Dubai players
FC Dallas players
Independiente Santa Fe footballers
Atlético Huila footballers
Unión Magdalena footballers
Colombia international footballers
2001 Copa América players
2004 Copa América players
2007 Copa América players
Expatriate footballers in Brazil
Expatriate footballers in the United Arab Emirates
Expatriate soccer players in the United States
Categoría Primera A players
Categoría Primera B players
Major League Soccer players
Major League Soccer All-Stars
Designated Players (MLS)
Copa América-winning players
Tigres F.C. footballers
UAE Pro League players
Association football midfielders
Sportspeople from Magdalena Department